|}

The Nickel Coin Mares' Standard Open NH Flat Race is a Grade 2 National Hunt flat race in Great Britain which is open to fillies and mares aged four to six years. It is run at Aintree over a distance of about 2 miles and 1 furlong (2 miles and 209 yards, or ), and it is scheduled to take place each year during the Grand National meeting in early April.

The race is named after Nickel Coin, the winner of the 1951 Grand National and the most recent mare to win the Grand National. The race was first run in 2005 with Listed status, then was promoted to Grade 2 in 2016.

Records
Leading jockey (2 wins):
 Robert Thornton - Senorita Rumbalita (2005), Avispa (2014) 
 Ruby Walsh – Rhacophorus (2006), Candy Creek (2009)

Leading trainer (3 wins):
 Alan King – Senorita Rumbalita (2005), Avispa (2014), The Glancing Queen (2019)

Winners

See also 
 Horse racing in Great Britain
 List of British National Hunt races

References 

Racing Post:

National Hunt races in Great Britain
Aintree Racecourse
National Hunt flat races
Recurring sporting events established in 2005
2005 establishments in England